Chocoheros is a monotypic genus of cichlid. Its only known species is Chocoheros microlepis, found in South America. It is endemic to the single river basin of Rio Baudó on the Pacific side of Colombia.

References

Heroini
Monotypic fish genera